The olive-backed woodcreeper (Xiphorhynchus triangularis) is a species of bird in the subfamily Dendrocolaptinae. It is found in Bolivia, Colombia, Ecuador, Peru, and Venezuela. Its natural habitat is subtropical or tropical moist montane forests.

References

olive-backed woodcreeper
Birds of the Northern Andes
olive-backed woodcreeper
Taxonomy articles created by Polbot